AFK Union Žižkov is a football club in the Czech Republic. It was founded in 1907 in the town of Žižkov, which is now a district of Prague.

Historical names 
 AFK Union Žižkov (1907–?)
 ASK Union Žižkov (?–1948)
 Sokol Union Žižkov (1948–1950)
 Sokol Žižkov B (1950–1952)
 ZSJ Pošta Žižkov (1952–1953)
 TJ Dynamo Žižkov Spoje (1953–?)
 TJ Spoje Žižkov
 TJ Union Žižkov
 AFK Union Žižkov

External links
 Official website 
 AFK Union Žižkov at the website of the Prague Football Association 

Football clubs in the Czech Republic
Football clubs in Prague
Association football clubs established in 1907
Football clubs in Austria-Hungary
1907 establishments in Austria-Hungary
Žižkov